Roberto Rotatori (born 14 November 1967) is an Italian equestrian. He competed in two events at the 2008 Summer Olympics.

References

External links
 

1967 births
Living people
Italian male equestrians
Olympic equestrians of Italy
Equestrians at the 2008 Summer Olympics
Sportspeople from Milan